Pelkonen is a surname.  It is most common for Finland and Sweden. Notable people with the surname include:

Aarne Pelkonen (1891–1959), Finnish gymnast
Jaana Pelkonen (born 1977), Finnish politician and television hostess
Jyri Pelkonen (born 1965), Finnish Nordic combined skier
Pentti Pelkonen (born 1930), Finnish cross-country skier
Rainer Pelkonen (born 1928), Finnish hurdler